Ectot-lès-Baons is a commune in the Seine-Maritime department in the Normandy region in northern France.

Geography
The commune is crossed by two major roads: the A151 autorouteto the southwest and the A29 autoroute on the northern border.

Population

Places of interest
 The church of Notre-Dame, dating from the thirteenth century.

See also
Communes of the Seine-Maritime department

References

Communes of Seine-Maritime